Contrast may refer to:

Science
 Contrast (vision), the contradiction in form, colour and light between parts of an image
 Contrast (statistics), a combination of averages whose coefficients add up to zero, or the difference between two means
 Behavioral contrast, a phenomenon studied in psychology (behavior analysis)
 Contrast agent, used to distinguish structures or fluids within a body, often shortened to just "contrast"

Technology
 Contrast ratio, a measure of a display system
 Display contrast, of electronic visual displays

Language
 Contrast (linguistics), expressing distinctions between words
 Contrast (literary), describing the difference(s) between two or more entities

Arts and entertainment

Music
 The Contrast (band), an English pop band formed in 1999
 Contrast (music), the difference between parts or different instrumental sounds

Albums
 Contrast (Conor Maynard album), 2012
 Contrast (Matt Fax album), 2017
 Contrast (EP), by the Features, 2006
 Contrast, by Emi Maria, 2010
 Contrast, by Klinik, 1992
 Contrast, by Signal Aout 42, 1990
 Contrast, an EP by Toru Kitajima, 2014

Other media
 Contrast (video game), a 2013 puzzle-based platform game
 The Contrast (play), a 1787 play by Royall Tyler
The Contrast (novel), an 1832 novel by Lord Normanby 
 Contrast.Rip (fashion), a clothing brand

See also
 Contrastive (disambiguation)
 Contrasts (disambiguation)